Lorong Waktu (literally translated as The Time Passage) is an Indonesian animated television series with the theme of religion and science fiction produced by CookIt Studio which is the animation division of Demi Gisela Citra Sinema. This series aired on SCTV in May 2019 to coincide with the month of Ramadan 1440 H. This series itself is a loose adaptation of television series with same title which was produced from 1999 to 2006. In the Anugerah Syiar Ramadan 2020 award organized by the Indonesian Broadcasting Commission (KPI), the Indonesian Ulema Council (MUI) and the Ministry of Youth and Sports (Kemenpora), this series won the award for the category "Best Animated Film Program".

Currently, all episodes of the Lorong Waktu animated series can be watched for free on Vidio.com, which is also in the same group as SCTV under the Emtek banner.

Plot
Lorong Waktu tells the adventures of Ustād Addin, Haji Husin and a young student named Zidan. Ustād Addin is a young orphan who is considered a child by Haji Husin and have skills in information technology. He then invented a time machine which then took Haji Husin and Zidan on an adventure through the past or the future.

Overall the plot of this animated series is almost similar to the television version that aired from 1999 to 2006. The basic differences brought in the animated series include the location of the mosque which was inspired by the Siti Rawani Mosque (it was used as the main location in the first season on TV series before being replaced by the Baitussalam Grand Mosque from season two to six) and the figure of Ustād Addin who is described as a single (as he appeared in the first and second seasons on TV series before marrying Sabrina).

The depictions of the characters of Haji Husin, Ustād Addin and Zidan also take from the characters on TV series version, each with a likeness similar to Deddy Mizwar, Adjie Pangestu (who played Ustād Addin in the first season in the TV series) and Jourast Jordy.

Cast
 Deddy Mizwar as Haji Husin
 Santosa Amin as Ustād Addin
 Novalina Nasution as Zidan
 Jheni Rinjo as Zidan's Mother
 Mirna Haryati as Thoif / Ibu Aisyah
 Vika Damayanti as Ramdan
 Kuswayanti Worodewi as Lukman / Ibu Ramdan

Production

Development
The development for the production of the Lorong Waktu animated series has started since December 2018. Deddy Mizwar as the producer at that time listened to many suggestions from fans so that Lorong Waktu could be remade in a new version and on the other hand some people also felt bored with Para Pencari Tuhan series who started monotonous since some of the main players resigned such as Trio Bajaj, Agus Kuncoro and Zaskia Adya Mecca. But on the other hand, Deddy also couldn't recreate Lorong Waktu due to the cast factor, including it was difficult to find a replacement for Jourast Jordy to play Zidan's character. As an alternative to fulfill the audience's longing, Deddy then chose to produce Lorong Waktu in an animated version.

According to Deddy Mizwar, the basis for taking the storyline is based on Quran Sura Al-Asr which means time. So according to Deddy, the concept of the Lorong Waktu story is that all humans are at a loss, except those who always do good deeds to advise each other in truth and patience. Apart from that, another inspiration that forms the basis of this series is the Prophet Muhammad's Isra and Mi'raj. Many of the Prophet's companions did not believe that the Prophet could travel to Sidrat al-Muntaha in one night, but it turned out that it was possible if Allah allowed.

Although not significant, some people consider Lorong Waktu to be inspired by mainstream works such as H. G. Wells' The Time Machine and Steven Spielberg's Back to the Future franchise. There is also a similarity in idea with the Quantum Leap in the 1990s which also used the idea of a time machine. Although the idea for the Lorong Waktu series may not be original, it is something new for the Indonesian television.

Casting
Of all the actors and actresses who played a role in the Lorong Waktu television series, only Deddy Mizwar continued to play the same character as the voice of Haji Husin for the animated version. For the characters of Ustaz Addin and Zidan, the voices are filled by professional dubbers. Ustaz Addin is voiced by Santosa Amin, who also has experience as dubber for Indonesian version of Suneo Honekawa in Doraemon and SpongeBob SquarePants in SpongeBob SquarePants. Meanwhile, the voice actor for Zidan is Novalina Nasution, who also to be the voice of Jimmy Neutron.

Several other famous voice actors who appear in this animated series include Jheni Rinjo as Zidan's mother. Jheni was previously famous as dubber for Sandy Cheeks in Indonesian version. In addition, there is also Mirna Haryati who has been a dubber for the Gundam series, Kuswayanti Woro Dewi who became a dubber for Korean dramas and Hana Bahagiana who is a dubber for Naruto Uzumaki's character in Naruto.

Music
Yovial Tri Purnomo Virgi is the music director for the animated series Lorong Time. Previously he was famous as a composer and music director for many films and television series since 2007.

The series' main theme is Waktu (Time), composed by Harry Budiman and sung by Novalina Nasution. This song was released on Apple Music on July 7, 2019.

Episode
In total there have been 18 episodes produced with a duration of each episode is 7 minutes.
Zidan Rindu Kakek (Zidan Miss Grandpa)
Rindu Ka'bah (Miss the Kaaba)
Rantang Amanah (Trustworthiness)
Jaga Lisan (Keeping Speech)
Durian Runtuh (Windfall)
Sayang Ibu (Love Mother)
Allah Maha Pengasih (Allah the Most Gracious)
Adab Makan (Eating Etiquette)
Sepeda Impian (Dreaming About the Bicycle)
Terima Kasih Guru (Thank You My Teacher)
Tolong Menolong (Mutual Helping)
Mengubah Takdir (Change the Destiny)
Koruptor (Corruptor)
Malas Belajar (Lazy to Study)
Bismillah
Berbaik Sangka Kepada Allah (Be Good to Allah)
Menghafal Al-Qur'an (Memorizing the Qur'an)
Ngeprank (Practical Joke)

Accolade

References

External links
 
 
 

Television series about Islam
Indonesian time travel television series
Indonesian children's animated science fiction television series
2010s time travel television series
2010s Indonesian television series
2019 Indonesian television series debuts
2019 Indonesian television series endings
SCTV (TV network) original programming